Juan Happy Love Story is a 2016 Philippine television drama comedy romance series broadcast by GMA Network. It premiered on the network's Telebabad line up and worldwide on GMA Pinoy TV from May 16, 2016, to September 2, 2016, replacing Because of You.

Mega Manila and Urban Luzon ratings are provided by AGB Nielsen Philippines.

Series overview

Episodes

May 2016

June 2016

July 2016

August 2016

September 2016

References

Lists of Philippine drama television series episodes